Wattamolla is a locality in the City of Shoalhaven in New South Wales, Australia. It lies in the valley of Brogers Creek about 16 km east of Kangaroo Valley.

References

City of Shoalhaven
Localities in New South Wales